Luke Anthony Radford (born 3 June 1988 in Worcester) is an English cricketer active in 2011 who played for Leicestershire. He appeared in one first-class match as a righthanded batsman who bowled right arm medium fast. He scored no runs and took two wickets with a best performance of two for 47.

Luke is the son of former test cricketer Neal Radford

Notes

1988 births
English cricketers
Leicestershire cricketers
Living people
Sportspeople from Worcester, England
English cricketers of the 21st century